Brel may refer to:

Andrew Brel (born Andreas Broulidakis 28 September 1960), UK music producer
Jacques Brel (1929-1978), French-speaking Belgian singer
Daniel Brel (b. 1950), French accordionist
British Rail Engineering Limited (BREL, 1969–1989), defunct railway systems engineering company